Blijdorp is a metro station, as a part of the Rotterdam metro and the regional light rail system RandstadRail, located in Rotterdam-Blijdorp, the Netherlands.

The station was opened on 17 August 2010, together with the tunnel connecting the metro station of Rotterdam Centraal to the Hofpleinlijn, which is part of the RandstadRail project.
Since the station opened, line E trains run from Rotterdam Centraal towards Den Haag Centraal. After approximately one year, in 2011, a connection was established with the existing metro network of Rotterdam, allowing a direct connection between Slinge station and Den Haag Centraal.

On 26 May 2010 a disaster drill was held in this station. In order to make it seem real an old metrocar was destroyed

Train services
The following services currently call at Blijdorp:

References

RandstadRail stations in Rotterdam
Railway stations opened in 2010